The Echo 12 is a Canadian rowboat, motorboat and sailing dinghy that was first built in 1979.

The Echo 12 is a development of the West German Koralle Junior.

Production
The design is built by C&L Boatworks in Belleville, Ontario and was at one time also built by Skene Boats of Gloucester, Ontario, both located in Canada. The design remains in production by C&L.

Design
The Echo 12 is a recreational sailboat, built predominantly of fibreglass, with wood trim. For sailing it has a fractional sloop rig, with aluminum spars, a raked stem, a plumb transom, a transom-hung, kick-up rudder made from mahogany, controlled by a tiller and a retractable mahogany daggerboard. It displaces , has a bow storage compartment and may be fitted with a whisker pole. The mainsheet is mounted mid-boom to a block on the cockpit deck.

The mast is a two-piece design to allow it to be disassembled for car-top transport.

It also was factory-delivered with an athwartships seat and oarlocks for rowing.

For racing the design is usually crewed by two sailors.

Operational history
In a 1994 review Richard Sherwood wrote, "a straightforward beginner's boat, the Echo has been designed for versatility and may also be rowed or powered (with a maximum of five-horsepower outboard). Oarlock sockets are built in, and there is a pad for the motor. A rowing seat runs athwartship."

See also
List of sailing boat types

Similar sailboats
Blue Crab 11
Puffer (dinghy)
Shrimp (dinghy)
Skunk 11

References

External links

Official website archives on Archive.org

Dinghies
1970s sailboat type designs
Sailing yachts
Sailboat types built in Canada
Sailboat types built by C&L Boatworks
Sailboat types built by Skene Boats